Cape Agassiz is the east tip of Hollick-Kenyon Peninsula, a narrow ice-drowned spur extending east from the main mountain axis of the Antarctic Peninsula between Mobiloil Inlet and Revelle Inlet. The cape is the east end of a line from Cape Jeremy dividing Graham Land and Palmer Land. It was discovered in December 1940 by the United States Antarctic Service who named it for W.L.G. Joerg, a geographer and polar specialist. At his request it was named by the Advisory Committee on Antarctic Names for Louis Agassiz, an internationally famous American naturalist and geologist of Swiss origin, who first propounded the theory of continental glaciation (Etudes sur les Glaciers, Neuchatel, 1840).

Headlands of Palmer Land
Headlands of Graham Land
Bowman Coast